Lalian railway station is located in Pakistan.

See also
 List of railway stations in Pakistan
 Pakistan Railways

References

External links

Railway stations in Punjab, Pakistan
Railway stations on Sangla Hill–Kundian Branch Line